Kim Ok-hui (born ) is a retired North Korean female volleyball player, playing as a libero. She was part of the North Korea women's national volleyball team. She participated at the 2010 Asian Games. On club level she played for Sobaeksu in 2010.

References

1985 births
Living people
North Korean women's volleyball players
Volleyball players at the 2010 Asian Games
Place of birth missing (living people)
Asian Games competitors for North Korea
21st-century North Korean women